Endless Forms Most Beautiful World Tour was the sixth world tour by Finnish symphonic metal band Nightwish, in support of their eighth studio album, Endless Forms Most Beautiful.

It was the first full tour featuring lead singer Floor Jansen, who replaced Anette Olzon in late 2012, and it was the first tour featuring drummer Kai Hahto, who replaced Jukka Nevalainen on hiatus due to health issues.

The band toured United States and Canada from April to May 2015 and in June started a series of festivals appearances across Europe, including two headlining shows in Finland; In September, the band took part in the traditional Rock in Rio festival in Brazil, also with additional dates for Latin America, and then toured European arenas from October to November, ending the leg at the famous Wembley Arena in London. In 2016, the band toured Australia in January, embarked on another North American tour in February and March, followed by Asia in April, and a small tour in Russia and Ukraine before setting off for another series of festivals.

Both concerts in Tampere Stadium and Wembley Arena were recorded for a live DVD called Vehicle of Spirit which was released on December 16, 2016.

On August 20, 2016 at the Himos Park show, original Nightwish bassist Sami Vänskä joined the band on stage to play "Stargazers" with them on bass while Marko joined the crowd. Jukka Nevalainen was also a guest, filling in for Kai Hahto for drums to play "Last Ride of the Day".

The band made their first appearance back in South Korea since the Wishmaster World Tour fifteen years ago.

Reception

Samantha Wu from V13, gave the Toronto performance a positive review. She praised Floor Jansen's vocals and her presence on stage, citing that she "is a thrill to watch". She also praised the inclusion of old songs like "Stargazers" being added to the setlist which have not been performed in a long while, as well as the spotlight shining moment with Marco Hietala's performance of "The Islander". Samantha concluded her review by stating that that Floor was the perfect fit for the band in which she hopes she will be with the band for a long time, as well as stating their performance that night was 'simply outstanding'.

Anabel from RockRevolt Magazine who attended the Greek Theater performance in Los Angeles had given the show a positive review. In their review of the concert, they pointed out the nature and traveler themed imagery and props used for the stage, used in the adventurer theme of the album itself. The reviewer praised the strong setlist, referring to the energetic songs and beautiful ballads on the set. The reviewer cited Floor Jansen's vocals as awe-inspiring in which she had stolen the show for the use of her theatrical expressions. The reviewer concluded their review, stating that the encore songs were the "icing on the cake" finish for an amazing show.

Dan Shutt, a reporter from The Independent, who had attended the sold out Wembley performance, noted on the energy and excitement of the show as a spectacle, sticking to the formula with pyrotechnics and visual effects playing throughout the biggest songs. However, he criticized the lack of personalisation which was outweighed by Floor's vocals.

Setlist

Sample Setlist
The following setlist was performed at the first show of the tour at Hammerstein Ballroom, but has since had alterations to it:
 "The Greatest Show on Earth "Chapter V: Sea-Worn Driftwood""  (intro)
 "Shudder Before the Beautiful"
 "Yours Is an Empty Hope"
 "Amaranth"
 "She Is My Sin"
 "Endless Forms Most Beautiful"
 "My Walden"
 "The Islander"
 "Élan"
 "Weak Fantasy"
 "Storytime"
 "Nemo"
 "I Want My Tears Back"
 "Stargazers"
 "Sleeping Sun"
 "The Greatest Show on Earth (Chapter II and III)"
Encore:
 "Ghost Love Score"
 "Last Ride of the Day"

Tour dates

Cancelled dates

Personnel

 Floor Jansen – female vocals
 Tuomas Holopainen – keyboards
 Emppu Vuorinen – guitars
 Kai Hahto – drums
 Marko Hietala – bass, male vocals
 Troy Donockley – Uilleann pipes, tin whistle, additional vocals, additional guitars

Additional musicians
Tony Kakko – guest vocals on "The Islander" and "Last Ride of the Day" at Rock in Rio 2015
Richard Dawkins – live narration on "The Greatest Show on Earth" at Wembley Arena
Sami Vänskä – guest bassist on "Stargazers" at Himos Park
Jukka Nevalainen – guest drummer on "Last Ride of the Day" at Himos Park

Tour production
 Basty Duellmann – tour manager
 Roger Smith – tour manager (North America, Asia)
 Ville Lipiäinen – camera director, editing (Vehicle of Spirit)
 Mikko Linnavuori – stage design, screen video content
 Eero Helle – stage production, design, special effects, lighting
 Markku Aalto – stage production, design, special effects, pyrotechnician
 Teemu Koivistoinen – assistant pyrotechnician
 Antti Toiviainen – guitar technician
 Ulrich Weitz – drum technician
 Kimmo Ahola – sound engineer
 Marja Brink – make-up, hairstylist for Jansen
 Enrico Karolczak – booking agent
 Konstantin Byleev – tour promoter (Russia, Ukraine)
 Aki Rönkkö – monitor engineer
 Andy Copping – booking (Download Festival)
 Ville Wahlroos – lighting

References

Sources

External links
Nightwish's Official Website

Nightwish concert tours
2015 concert tours
2016 concert tours